Amanda Fowler may refer to:

 Amanda Fowler (swimmer) (born 1996), Australian Paralympian
 Amanda Fowler (Neighbours), a character from the Australian soap opera Neighbours
 Amanda Cory Fowler, a character on the American soap opera Another World